Slovakia competed at the 2019 Military World Games held in Wuhan, China from 18 to 27 October 2019. In total, athletes representing Slovakia won two silver medals and one bronze medal. All medals were won in athletics and the country finished in 40th place in the medal table.

Medal summary

Medal by sports

Medalists

References 
 2019 Military World Games - Athletics results

Nations at the 2019 Military World Games
2019 in Slovak sport